The Colorado Mass Choir is an American gospel choir.

The group's director is Joe Pace.The choir was founded by the late Reverend James Moore. They released their first album in 1996, and won a Stellar Award for New Artist of the Year. Several releases on Verity Records followed.

Discography
 Watch God Move (Verity Records, 1996) U.S. Gospel #17
 So Good! (Verity, 1998) U.S. Gospel #10
 God's Got It (Verity, 1999)
 Speak Life (Integrity Gospel, 2003)
 Praise 'Til You Breakthrough (Alliant Music, 2006)

References

Choirs in Colorado
American gospel musical groups
Musical groups established in 1997